Charlesworth at Large is a British crime television series which originally aired on the BBC in 1958. Wensley Pithey revived his role as Detective Superintendent Charlesworth of Scotland Yard which he had played in two previous series.

Selected cast

Regular
 Wensley Pithey as Det. Supt. Charlesworth 
 Tony Church as  Sgt. Spence 
 Edward Higgins as  PC Wrothbury

Other
 Peter Reynolds as The Angel
 Sam Kydd as  Lorris
 Joan Hickson as  Miss Frisby
 Ian Fleming as Mr. Wedlake
 Noel Howlett as The Scribe
 Graham Crowden as  Landlord
 John Nettleton as  Police Sergeant
 Bernard Kay as  Cotter
 William Kendall as Stanley
 Charles Lloyd Pack as Arthur Baker
 Morris Perry as Sergeant Begbie
 Frank Pettingell as Horrobin
 Elsie Wagstaff as Mrs. Pawson

References

Bibliography
 Noble, Peter. British Film and Television Yearbook, Volume 10. British and American Film Press, 1960.

External links
 

BBC television dramas
1958 British television series debuts
1958 British television series endings
1950s British crime television series
English-language television shows